Inside American Education: The Decline, The Deception, The Dogmas is a book by economist and social theorist Thomas Sowell (hardcover 1993, paperback 2003, Kindle Edition 2010) that details Sowell's assessment of the state of education in the United States (both K-12 education and higher education).

Contents

Criticism of educational "fads"
Sowell was critical of a number of educational programs and paradigms that became popular in the United States in the 1960s onward. Among the programs that he critiqued in his book and other writings were:

 Man: A Course of Study: Sowell called the curriculum a controversial curriculum and was critical both of the curriculum and the stealth with which it was introduced.
 Values clarification: Sowell was critical of "values clarification" programs and wrote (in his book as well as in later online pieces) that:

The very phrase "values clarification" is fundamentally dishonest. When parents tell their children not to steal or not to have sex, there is no ambiguity as to what they mean. Clarification is neither required nor attempted. Instead, values are downgraded to subjective preferences of individuals or blind traditions of "our society," and contrasted with alternative values of other individuals and other societies -- including, in some cases, the societies of various species of animals.[152] The "nonjudgmental" approach which pervades such exercises provides no principle of logic or morality by which to choose among the many alternatives presented -- except, implicitly, what "peers" or "experts" or "modern thinking" might prefer. "Clarification" is merely a process used to camouflage this process of undermining the child's existing values. (Page 65)

Sowell has elaborated on his arguments against values clarification on online articles.
 Other educational programs including sex education, drug education, and affective education. Sowell claimed that the programs often strayed from their stated goals and engaged in generic brainwashing of people intended to indoctrinate them and turn them against their parents. In addition, Sowell claimed that many programs labeled as gifted and talented programs also ended up being courses in indoctrination. Sowell named educational theorist Carl Rogers as an important influence on these programs.
 Sowell argued against peace education and nuclear education programs on similar grounds.
 Sowell was also critical of bilingual education and cited studies showing that many parents were opposed to such education.

Criticism of low skill level of school teachers
Sowell was critical of schools of education for training the future teachers in educational fads and having low overall standards, and was critical of states requiring people to have credentials from schools of education to take teaching jobs.

Criticism of ideological double standards at colleges
Sowell argued that higher educational institutions were full of double standards, including standards that excused violence and disruption when carried out in the name of politically correct goals, but were extremely harsh on small infractions that might be perceived to oppose politically correct goals. Sowell also criticized the decision of Stanford University president Donald Kennedy to expel China scholar Steven W. Mosher from the Ph.D. program, alleging: "Not one stated requirement for the doctorate in anthropology was even claimed to have been violated...Instead, criteria of personal behavior were created ex post.

Criticism of poor college teaching
Sowell argued that, unlike school teaching, the average quality of college teaching was better. He identified a few problems:

 Wide variation in teaching standards between instructors at the same institution, with fairly poor instruction at the lower end.
 Instructors in ideologically driven courses offering easy grades and lax grading standards in order to attract students.
 Political indoctrination in courses, including indoctrination in topics unrelated to the alleged subject of study.

Reception
Chester E. Finn Jr., a former United States Assistant Secretary of Education under William Bennett, praised the book in a review for National Review as "a clear, hard-hitting, amply documented work that manages to be strong without being shrill, sensible yet not narrow-minded, outraged but not outrageous."

For Forbes, James W. Michaels called Sowell "an American Emile Zola, accusing the smug American educational leadership of hypocrisy,  anti-intellectualism, avarice and propagandizing for  essentially left-wing causes...in a factual, analytic style."

A review in Arts Education Policy Review called the book "a penetrating and comprehensive criticism of the educational establishment. Amidst the turbidity of educational debate, it provides a bracing splash of cold reason...The book is an excellent resource for policy discussions and development and offers provocative analysis of the many ills besetting education. Sowell adeptly dismantles many of the familiar arguments for multiculturalism, racial quotas, values clarification, various administrative policies, and other educational practices, and in so doing, he exposes the deceptions and dogmas that have insulated these practices from accountability."

John Brademas, a former Democratic Party member of the United States House of Representatives and president of New York University, offered a critical review in The New York Times: "Some of Mr. Sowell's attacks are on target, but his generalizations are so extravagant and his tone so self-righteous and bombastic that he undermines his case." Brademas added that the book "offers little constructive counsel" on dealing with the issues surrounding education in the United States.

Publishers Weekly called some critiques in this book regarding athletic scholarships and publish or perish "well reasoned" but added that Sowell "often goes wildly askew, as when he argues that sex education causes teen pregnancy."

See also
 Market Education, a book by Andrew J. Coulson about the history of education worldwide.
 The Beautiful Tree, a book by James Tooley about low-cost private education for poor people.

References

Books by Thomas Sowell
Books about education
1993 non-fiction books